Balavihar Matriculation Higher Secondary School (BVMS) is the first private matriculation school in Tamil Nadu which was established in 1971 in Panruti , Tamil Nadu, India.
And had more than 10 branches in various part of Cuddalore district. But now due to the demise of the illustrious founder of this school Lion V Jagannathan, the school faced many hurdles and then finally closed operations in many branches and now only few of the branches are in operation .

See also
 List of educational institutions in Cuddalore District

References

Cuddalore district
Primary schools in Tamil Nadu
High schools and secondary schools in Tamil Nadu
Education in Cuddalore district
Educational institutions established in 1971
1971 establishments in Tamil Nadu
https://goo.gl/maps/evfhihLXLskUUNCE6